Sabina Gadecki (born September 28, 1983) is an American actress and fashion model.

Early life 
She was born on September 28, 1983 in Boston, Massachusetts  to Polish parents, Irena and Richard Gadecki. She is a graduate of Chicopee High School and Holyoke Community College.

She studied International Business and Communications at Fordham University, while pursuing a career in modeling and acting in New York. She studied acting at William Esper Studio continuously for four years before moving to Los Angeles.

Career 
In 2007, she gained attention as the host of World Poker Tour on The Travel Channel, and she went on to sign with Ford Models. Gadecki has modeled for several brands, including Saks Fifth Avenue, Oil of Olay, Banana Republic and Jimmy Choo. She is a former Miss Polonia America and Miss Polonia World. She is currently signed to Wilhelmina Models in Los Angeles.

Gadecki has had major recurring roles in TV shows such as L.A.'s Finest starring Gabrielle Union and Jessica Alba, and also appeared in Narcos: Mexico, The Affair and House of Lies. She played Melanie in the comedy film Entourage (2015) alongside Jeremy Piven and Adrian Grenier.

Personal life 
Gadecki dated her Entourage co-star Kevin Connolly from 2015 to 2016. Gadecki began dating country music singer Tyler Rich, after meeting at Stagecoach Festival in 2016. The couple married in Murfreesboro, Tennessee in September 2019. The couple appeared on the Winter/Spring 2020 cover of Southern Bride magazine. Rich wrote the song, "Leave Her Wild" for Gadecki.

Filmography

Film

Television

References

External links

Girl Poker Player Profile

American television actresses
Living people
Poker commentators
People from Chicopee, Massachusetts
American people of Polish descent
1983 births
21st-century American women